Hoa H. Nguyen is an American politician serving as a member of the Oregon House of Representatives for the 48th district. Elected in November 2022, she assumed office on January 9, 2023.

Early life and education 
Nguyen was born and raised in New Orleans, the daughter of Vietnamese immigrants. At the age of 15, she relocated to Portland, Oregon, where she graduated from St. Mary's Academy in 2003. Nguyen earned a Bachelor of Arts degree in sociology from Portland State University in 2008.

Career 
From 2008 to 2010, Nguyen worked as an extended day coordinator for the Metropolitan Family Service and Neighborhood House. Nguyen later worked as a school attendance case manager and school program manager for Neighborhood House. From 2015 to 2022, she served as a school attendance coach for Portland Public Schools. Nguyen joined the Clackamas Education Service District in August 2022 as a student and community engagement specialist. She was elected to the Oregon House of Representatives in November 2022.

References 

Living people
American politicians of Vietnamese descent
People from New Orleans
Politicians from New Orleans
People from Portland, Oregon
Politicians from Portland, Oregon
Oregon Democrats
Members of the Oregon House of Representatives
Women state legislators in Oregon
Portland State University alumni